Arauá River may refer to the following rivers in Brazil:

Brazil
 Arauá River (Aripuanã River tributary), Amazonas
 Arauá River (Coari River tributary), Amazonas
 Arauá River (Sergipe)
 Arauã River, Amazonas